Monacillo Urbano is one of 18 barrios in the municipality of San Juan, Puerto Rico. The barrio was originally part of Monacillo. In 2010, it had a population of 22,342 living in a land area of 3.23 square miles (8.68 km2). Monacillo Urbano is surrounded by Gobernador Piñero barrio to the north, El Cinco barrio to the east, Monacillo barrio to the south, and the municipality of Guaynabo to the west.

Demographics

See also

 List of communities in Puerto Rico

References

Río Piedras, Puerto Rico
Barrios of San Juan, Puerto Rico